The 1954 Currie Cup was the 25th edition of the Currie Cup, the premier domestic rugby union competition in South Africa.

Fixtures and Results

Semi-final

Final

See also

 Currie Cup

References

1954
1954 in South African rugby union
Currie